Haysbert is a surname. Notable people with the surname include:

Dennis Haysbert (born 1954), American actor
JoAnn Haysbert (born 1948), American educator and academic administrator
Raymond V. Haysbert (1920–2010), American businessman and civil rights activist